Feyenoord is one of the three major association football clubs in the Netherlands, and have a successful record playing in European competition. They have won the European Cup/Champions League one time, and the UEFA Cup twice. In addition, the club has also won the Intercontinental Cup once, and played in one UEFA Super Cup match. Below is a list of all official European matches contested by Feyenoord.

European match history

European Cup / UEFA Champions League

European Cup Winners' Cup

UEFA Cup / UEFA Europa League

UEFA Europa Conference League

Inter-Cities Fairs Cup

UEFA Super Cup

Intercontinental Cup
In addition to the European competitions the club played in, Feyenoord's 1970 victory in the European Cup gave them Europe's place in that year's Intercontinental Cup, played against the winners of the Copa Libertadores.

European record

Record by competition

Record by nation

European finals

References

Europe
Feyenoord